In September 1917, an incident between police and anarchists in the Bay View neighborhood of Milwaukee, Wisconsin, precipitated a larger campaign of Galleanist attacks across the United States. In response to a rally held by a reverend near their clubhouse, the Galleanist anarchists of the Ferrer Circle rushed the stage and tore down the American flag. The police fired on them, killing two, and two detectives were injured in the crossfire. A retaliatory bomb intended for the reverend was relocated to the police headquarters, where its explosion killed nine detectives and a bystander. No one was convicted for this bombing. The November trial of Bay View anarchists for the earlier shooting incident was influenced by sentiment related to the bombing. The jury returned a quick guilty verdict despite what historian Paul Avrich described as insubstantial evidence. The verdict was overturned on appeal and most of the anarchists were released and deported. Until the September 11 attacks, according to the FBI Criminal Justice Information Services Division, the police station explosion was the worst recorded American police tragedy.

Incident 

On Sunday, September 9, 1917, the reverend of the Milwaukee Italian Evangelical Church, Augusto Giuliani, held a rally in Bay View, a largely Italian neighborhood, near the Francisco Ferrer Circle clubhouse. As Giuliani finished his speech and the crowd sang "America", the Ferrer Circle's Galleanist anarchists mounted the platform and tore down the American flag. Police fired on the demonstrators. The Circle's theater group director Antonio Fornasier was shot through his heart and died immediately. Augusto Marinelli fired back with a pistol and was shot in the chest, hospitalized, and died from his wounds five days later. Bartolo Testalin was shot in the back and survived. Two detectives had non-serious wounds.

The police arrested eleven anarchists. They described Mary Nardini as the riot's instigator. The police raided the Circle's clubhouse, confiscated anarchist publications, and roughed up Circle members.

Retaliation 

In Mexico, the Bay View incident spurred exiled Galleanists to retaliate. They had been planning their reprisal for the arrest of their mentor, the Italian–American insurrectionary anarchist Luigi Galleani, since his arrest in June 1917. After the September incident, three members of the group traveled to Chicago and Youngstown, Ohio.

On the evening of November 24, someone planted an iron pipe bomb in the basement of Giuliani's Italian Evangelical Church. It was discovered by the young daughter of the church's scrubwoman. It was moved to the police headquarters for inspection where, while handled and joked about by detectives, it went off. The explosion killed ten detectives, including one who had been wounded at the September rally, and a bystander who had come to report a robbery. Six additional police personnel were seriously injured: a lieutenant and five detectives.

The bombmaker was never identified. Historian of anarchism Paul Avrich wrote that it might have been local Ferrer Circle anarchists, but it was more likely to have been two of the Galleanists from Mexico, Mario Buda with the assistance of Carlo Valdinoci, coming from Chicago and Youngstown, respectively. The Chicago Police Chief responsible for arresting the Haymarket anarchists sent two detectives who spoke Italian, to no avail. The police and public were outraged.

Trial 

The eleven anarchists involved in the Bay View incident were put on trial in late November. Though the anarchists were being tried for assault with intent to murder two detectives, observers believed that they were really on trial for the police station explosion. While only one or two of the accused had participated in the shooting, eleven were on trial. Testalin, for one, asked who he was accused of attempting to kill, having been shot in the back at the rally and detained since. The prosecution sought to prove conspiracy, similar to the Haymarket trial, that even if the defendants did not participate in the shooting, they were involved in the plan. The attorney cited the Circle's seized anarchist literature as evidence of their conspiratorial intentions.

The trial's jury returned in just 17 minutes with a guilty verdict despite what historian Paul Avrich described as insubstantial evidence. The verdict was later appealed and overturned. Most of the defendants were released and deported.

Impact 

The Bay View incident was the opening salvo in a series of attacks between police and the Galleanists across the United States.

The police station bombing, while not intended for the police, was, according to the FBI Criminal Justice Information Services Division, the country's "worst police tragedy" prior to the September 11 attacks. No one was convicted for the bombing.

References

Bibliography

Further reading 

 
 
 

September 1917 events
1917 in Wisconsin
Explosions in 1917
Anarchism in the United States
Galleanisti
1910s in Milwaukee
Political violence in the United States
Improvised explosive device bombings in the United States
Improvised explosive device bombings in the 1910s